The St. Vrain Historical Society, Inc. is a non-profit organization in Longmont, Colorado and was officially organized in 1963. The Society supports and maintains several historic properties: the Old Mill Park, Hoverhome, Hover Farmstead, and the Old St Stephens Church. Tours of Old Mill Park and Hover Farmstead can be arranged.

The mission of the Society is to promote historic education and preservation in Longmont and the surrounding St. Vrain Valley.

References

External links
St. Vrain Historical Society

Historical societies in Colorado
History museums in Colorado
Museums in Boulder County, Colorado
Longmont, Colorado